Vesela Hora may refer to the following places in Ukraine:

 Vesela Hora, Donetsk Oblast
 Vesela Hora, Luhansk Oblast